Duotang is a Canadian indie pop duo from Winnipeg, composed of Rod Slaughter and Sean Allum.

History
Slaughter and Allum began practicing together in the summer of 1995; their respective bands "Zen Bungalow" and "Bovine" shared a practice space, and the two began staying after practice to craft their own music.

In March 1996, they played a show with the Smugglers, and that led to their signing with Mint Records. On July 16, 1996, they released a 7" entitled The Message.

Their first album, Smash the Ships and Raise the Beams was recorded in Vancouver by Darryl Neudorf, and released on August 29, 1996. Their second album, The Cons & The Pros was released on May 20, 1998. They then toured Canada with fellow locals, The Weakerthans.

After the tour, Duotang was inactive for a time; Slaughter joined Winnipeg mod band Novillero in 1999, while Allum attended Creative Communications studies at Winnipeg's Red River College. The pair came back together to release a third full-length album entitled The Bright Side; it was recorded with Cam Loeppky at Private Ear Recording in Winnipeg, and released in June 2001.  In September 2001, they performed in Montreal with The Flashing Lights and The Datsons.

Duotang disbanded soon after the release of The Bright Side.  They reunited briefly in 2006 for the Mint Records Christmas Party.

In 2014, after a 13-year hiatus, Slaughter and Allum performed as Duotang at shows in Vancouver and Winnipeg. The band returned to touring in 2015, and released an album called New Occupation on October 14, 2016, on Montreal's Stomp Records.

Discography

Albums
Smash the Ships and Raise the Beams (1996)
The Cons & The Pros (1998)
The Bright Side (2001)
New Occupation (2016)

Compilations
Team Mint (1996), Mint Records
It's a Team Mint Xmas Vol. 1 (2000), Mint Records
Team Mint Volume 2! (2001), Mint Records
Somebody Needs A Timeout (2002), Campfirecords
It's a Team Mint Xmas Vol. 2 (2004), Mint Records
Mint Records Presents the CBC Radio 3 Sessions (2006), Mint Records
Taking It To Heart (2016), Treeline Recordings

See also

Music of Canada
Canadian rock
List of Canadian musicians
List of bands from Canada

References

External links
 Homepage
 Mint Records Artist Profile: Profile at Mint Records.
JAM! music interview at canoe.ca 
Pitchfork Review of The Bright Side

Canadian indie rock groups
Canadian indie pop groups
Mint Records artists
Musical groups established in 1995
Musical groups disestablished in 2001
Musical groups from Winnipeg
Rock music duos
Canadian musical duos
1995 establishments in Manitoba
2001 disestablishments in Manitoba